This is the list of the governors of West Kalimantan, a province in Indonesia.

References

West Kalimantan

West Kalimantan